Belet is a surname. Notable people with this name include:

 Ivo Belet, Belgian politician
 Tayfun Belet
 Michael Belet (disambiguation), multiple people
 Édouard Belet, Swiss wrestler
 Robert A. Belet
 Michael Belet (junior)
 Michael Belet (senior)

See also 
 Bellet
 Bellett